Narges-e Batuli (also Romanized as Narges-e Baţūlī; also known as Nargesī-ye Baţūlī) is a village in Tolbozan Rural District, Golgir District, Masjed Soleyman County, Khuzestan Province, Iran. At the 2006 census, its population was 16, in 5 families.

References 

Populated places in Masjed Soleyman County